Niclas Stierlin (born 22 January 2000) is a German footballer who plays as a midfielder for MSV Duisburg.

Club career
Stierlin made his professional debut for RB Leipzig on 26 July 2018, coming on as a substitute in the 85th minute for Bruma in the UEFA Europa League qualifying match against Swedish club BK Häcken of the Allsvenskan, which finished as a 4–0 home win.

After playing two years at SpVgg Unterhaching, he joined MSV Duisburg in the summer of 2021.

Career statistics

References

External links
 Profile at DFB.de
 

2000 births
Living people
Footballers from Mannheim
German footballers
Germany youth international footballers
Association football midfielders
RB Leipzig players
SpVgg Unterhaching players
MSV Duisburg players
3. Liga players
21st-century German people